Adam Devlin (born Adam Tadek Gorecki 17 September 1969 in Lambeth, London) is an English musician, best known as the guitarist and songwriter for The Bluetones.

Following the Bluetones split in 2011, Devlin formed Thee Cee Cees with singer-songwriter Chris T-T. The band released their debut album "Solution Songs" in 2015.

In 2015, the Bluetones reformed for a 20th anniversary tour of the UK.

On 29 March 2016, Devlin's brother Simon Gorecki was murdered along with his partner Natasha Sadler-Ellis at their home in Canterbury by her ex-boyfriend.

References

External links
Official Twitter

1969 births
Living people
English songwriters
English rock guitarists
The Bluetones members
People from Hounslow
Britpop musicians